The Luodong Forest Railway or Bong Bong Train was a 36.4 km (22.6 miles) long narrow gauge forest railway with a gauge of  near Luodong in Yilan County, Taiwan. The track was opened in 1924 and closed in 1979. A section will be re-used for tourist trains.

History
The Luodong Forest Railway was inaugurated on 27 January 1924 for goods services. Passenger transport commenced in May 1926 with 10 stations.

 
In 1970 Lin-Tailong railway station north of Luodong railway station was inaugurated. Chinese diesel rail cars were introduced in 1971, to improve the quality for the passengers while reducing the operating cost. The goods volume of forest produce declined after 1976, and passenger transport lost in importance due to increasing road traffic.

The track required many wooden bridges, and as a consequence it was prone to flood damage. Thus the track was de-commissioned on 1 August 1979 after 56 years of service. In August 2019, Wu Tze-cheng stated that the railway would be rebuilt in two phases, for a total cost of NT$8 million.

Track 
The railway was an extension of the Taiping Mountain Forest Railway. There were ten stations along the track, which passed seven tunnels and 17 or  22 bridges. A single trip lasted approximately 2 hours and 50 minutes.

Preserved buildings 
The rails were lifted and scrapped after de-commissioning, and the bridges and tunnels collapsed over time. There are still some railway station buildings and similar buildings as well as tunnels, dams and bridge pillars, of which some are listed as cultural heritage.

Tunnel No 8 of 1921 is still in sound condition fertiggestellte Tunnel Nr. 8 is well preserved and has been listed in July 2012 as a Grade II listed historic building. It is near the Lan Yang CreekDamm, approximately 350 metres off the settlement of the Zhiban tribe. It is only 40 m (44 yards) long. At its entrance are concrete vaults and in other areas solid rock of slate. The interior was originally reinforced by wooden struts which have disappeared over time.

Restoration 
New railway tracks were laid on both sides of the road at Tien-sung-pi railway station. New rolling stock in the historic style was manufactured and successfully tested. A 3.9-km-long piece of track is planned to be used for regular heritage trains starting with effect of October 2017.

References

External links 

 
 

1924 establishments in Taiwan
2 ft 6 in gauge railways in Taiwan
Forest railways in Taiwan
Railway lines opened in 1924
Tourist attractions in Yilan County, Taiwan